SPTA may refer to

Salisbury Plain Training Area
Scottish Primary Teachers' Association
Spectrin, alpha 1